

Chapter 8 Great Council of Chiefs (Bose Levu Vakaturaga)

Chapter 8: Executive Government.  Chapter 8 of the 1997 Constitution of Fiji is titled Great Council of Chiefs (Bose Levu Vakaturaga).  Its single section (Section 116) enshrines in the constitution a powerful feudal institution that has played a pivotal role in Fiji's history.

Section 116 Bose Levu Vakaturaga

This chapter, the shortest in the Fiji Constitution, stipulates that the Great Council of Chiefs, or Bose Levu Vakaturaga in Fijian, originally established under the Fijian Affairs Act, continues in existence, and that its membership, functions, operations, and procedures are as prescribed by that act.

The Great Council of Chiefs is a very old body, which has its roots in the chiefly councils established by Ratu Seru Epenisa Cakobau in the 1800s.  It was retained as a consultative body by the British colonial rulers.  It had no formal political role, however, until Fiji became independent in 1970.  Under the independence constitution, it gained the authority to nominate 8 of the then 22 Senators.

Today, the Great Council of Chiefs nominates 14 Senators out of 32, and also serves as an electoral college to choose the President and Vice-President.  But these powers are not stated in this chapter; they are set out elsewhere in the constitution.

Although previously established by an Act of Parliament, the framers of the 1997 Constitution thought it best to enshrine it there.  With increased political representation being granted to Indo-Fijians, the chiefs felt they needed the security of having the Great Council enshrined in the constitution, and not merely in a legal document that could be amended at the whim of politicians.

References

1997 Constitution of Fiji